Moses John Dyer (born 21 March 1997) is a New Zealand professional footballer who plays for USL Championship side FC Tulsa.

Club career

Wanderers SC
In September 2014, Dyer signed with New Zealand Premiership side Wanderers SC. Dyer made his competitive debut for Wanderers in the opening round of the 2014–15 ASB Premiership against Waitakere United in a 3–2 loss. That season, he made a total of nine league appearances for Wanderers.

Eastern Suburbs
In 2016, Dyer signed with Eastern Suburbs, making seventeen appearances that season and scoring five goals.

Northcote City
In mid 2017, Dyer signed for NPL 2 side Northcote City. Following his participation at the U-20 World Cup, Dyer trialed with several European sides including Arendal, Vejle Boldklub and Crewe Alexandra.

Second spell at Eastern Suburbs
In 2017, Dyer returned to Eastern Suburbs and made fifteen appearances that season, scoring four goals. In the last league game of the season, Dyer was sent off in the closing minutes for grabbing a Canterbury United opponent and dragging him to the ground.

Manukau United
On 30 March 2018, Dyer signed for Kevin Fallon's newly formed Manukau United in New Zealand's NRFL Premier.

Florø
On 25 July 2018, Dyer signed with Norwegian First Division side Florø SK. That season, he made seven appearances, scoring one goals as Florø was relegated to the Second Division. The following season, Dyer made nineteen league appearances, scoring six goals.

Valour FC
On 14 February 2020, Dyer signed with Canadian Premier League side Valour FC. He made his debut on August 16 against Cavalry FC. After the 2021 CPL season, Valour announced they had exercised Dyer's contract option, keeping him at the club through 2022. In December 2022, Valour announced that Dyer would be departing the club.

FC Tulsa
On 22 December 2022, Dyer signed with USL Championship side FC Tulsa.

International career
Dyer was born in New Zealand and is of Polynesian descent. Dyer was called up to the New Zealand senior team for a friendly against South Korea as a replacement for Ryan Thomas who had pulled out of the game due to injury He was substituted on in the second half, as New Zealand succumbed to a late goal to lose 1–0.

Following the South Korea friendly, New Zealand U-20 coach Darren Bazeley named several Under-20 eligible players, including Dyer for a 2-match tour of Uzbekistan against the Uzbekistan U-20s in preparation for the 2015 FIFA U-20 World Cup which was held in New Zealand. During this game, he came on as a second-half substitute in their first game, which New Zealand lost 1–0.

Dyer was a member of the New Zealand squad at the 2017 FIFA U-20 World Cup.

International goals
Scores and results list New Zealand's goal tally first.

References

External links
 
 

Living people
1997 births
Association football midfielders
New Zealand association footballers
Association footballers from Auckland
Sportspeople from Palmerston North
New Zealand Māori sportspeople
Wanderers Special Club players
Eastern Suburbs AFC players
Northcote City FC players
Florø SK players
Valour FC players
FC Tulsa players
New Zealand Football Championship players
National Premier Leagues players
Norwegian First Division players
Norwegian Second Division players
Canadian Premier League players
2016 OFC Nations Cup players
New Zealand international footballers
New Zealand under-20 international footballers
New Zealand under-23 international footballers
New Zealand expatriate association footballers
Expatriate soccer players in Australia
Expatriate footballers in Norway
Expatriate soccer players in Canada
New Zealand expatriate sportspeople in Australia
New Zealand expatriate sportspeople in Norway
New Zealand expatriate sportspeople in Canada
Expatriate soccer players in the United States
New Zealand expatriate sportspeople in the United States